Firewalker is a 1986 American action-adventure comedy film starring Chuck Norris, Louis Gossett Jr., Will Sampson in his final feature film role, and Melody Anderson. It was directed by J. Lee Thompson and written by Norman Aladjem, Robert Gosnell and Jeffrey M. Rosenbaum. This was the first comedic role for Norris, giving him a chance to poke fun at his action persona.

Plot
Max Donigan and Leo Porter are two "seasoned" treasure hunters whose adventures rarely result in any notable success. After their latest stint gone wrong, they are recruited by a seemingly psychic woman, Patricia Goodwin, owner of a treasure map. She convinces them that the map leads to a huge stockpile of gold belonging to the "Firewalker." She then says that someone, or thing, else is searching for the map: a red cyclops.

The map leads them to a cave on a local Native American Reservation. Patricia warns them that the cave is home to "old people, sleeping"; they later discover it is a mass grave filled with skeletons. They find a Spanish Conquistador helmet and mural depicting Aztec and Mayan art, with an anachronistic date of 1527. As Leo studies the mural, Max finds a ruby-pommeled dagger hidden inside a skull. They are ambushed inside the cave by a small group of men and Patricia is taken by one of them. After killing their attackers, Max and Leo confront the kidnapper; upon seeing the dagger, he screams and throws himself into a pit.

While discussing the nature of the dagger at a local bar, Max, Leo and Patricia hear from the barkeep about El Coyote: a local that believes himself descended from the Aztecs —and also happens to be a one-eyed man with an eye patch. The barkeep also directs them to Tall Eagle, a local Native American. He tells them that the Firewalker was a powerful being that flew away to walk in the fires of the sun and gives Patricia a small bag of "magic" to protect her. While trying to figure out where to go next, Patricia stabs the dagger into a map, then faints, giving them a location of San Miguel. Max is later drugged by a woman; El Coyote chants while holding a snake as the woman attempts to murder Max. A chanting Tall Eagle causes Patricia to suddenly wake and rush to Max's defense; she and Leo stop the woman from succeeding. They capture her, but she disappears overnight and a snake appears in her cell.

They travel to San Miguel and barter for information. A man named Boggs directs them to a contact in a village named Chajal; Boggs is later seen to have been working for, and is killed by, El Coyote. Dressed as priests and a nun to avoid detection, the trio make it to Chajal and find it completely deserted. Local militia chase them into the jungle on foot; they escape and make camp for the night. They are found in the morning by a friend of Max's: Corky Taylor, leader of a small group of Central American freedom fighters, who provides them with a vehicle to finish their journey. When they stop that night, Leo disappears; Patricia and Max believe him dead when they find blood and his glasses by the alligator-infested river.

The next morning, Patricia and Max find the temple they have been searching for. Inside, they find Leo alive and dangling from a rope, along with El Coyote. He offers Leo in exchange for the dagger, claiming he has no use for the three of them. After suggesting that Patricia can go free, she leaves and is sealed in a passageway. El Coyote laughs and explains that he will kill them and sacrifice Patricia to appease the gods and become the Firewalker. Max throws the dagger at El Coyote to kill him, but he catches it and leaves the chamber. Max rescues Leo as El Coyote prepares to kill Patricia. They reach her just in time; Max shoots El Coyote in the chest, seemingly killing him. Patricia finds the gold by placing the dagger in a slot on the altar, opening a chamber below it. After gathering the gold, El Coyote attacks them. Patricia stabs him in the back with the dagger just as he prepares to kill Max. With El Coyote stunned, Max is able to fight back, kicking him onto the altar. Patricia then sprinkles the magic bag on El Coyote's body; he bursts into flame as they leave the temple with the gold and the trio reap the rewards of their successful journey.

Cast

 Chuck Norris as Max Donigan
 Louis Gossett Jr. as Leo Porter
 Melody Anderson as Patricia Goodwin
 Will Sampson as Tall Eagle
 Sonny Landham as "El Coyote"
 John Rhys-Davies as "Corky" Taylor
 Ian Abercrombie as Boggs
 Richard Lee-Sung as The General
 Zaide Silvia Gutiérrez as Indian Girl
 Álvaro Carcaño as Willie
 John Hazelwood as Tubbs
 Dale Payne as Pilot
 Kevin Zinter as Co-Pilot
 Mário Arévalo as Guerilla Leader
 Miguel Ángel Fuentes as Big Man (as Miguel Fuentes)

Production
Chuck Norris wanted to write a comedy and was recommended to writer Robert Gosnell. Gosnell had written Firewalker and showed it to Norris, who decided to make it instead of the comedy.

The film was Norris' first comedy, even though it was still an action film. It was described as "two guys, a girl and a Jeep on the road to a fortune in lost Aztec treasure."

"It's a detour," said Norris. "Max Donegan is really the lighter side of Chuck Norris." He added, "It's just an open, friendly, warm film with a lot of humor. It has the adventure of a Romancing the Stone and Raiders of the Lost Ark, the humor of the movie Crocodile Dundee -- where the situations cause the humor -- and the companionship between the two guys like Butch Cassidy and the Sundance Kid."

Norris says that Cannon's chairman, Menahem Golan, showed "a little skepticism" when Norris first took the film to him to develop. "It's not the type of film I'm known for doing," said Norris. But Norris had a seven-year deal with Cannon and was their leading box office star along with Charles Bronson. "Whether I do more lighter-type films beyond this one will be determined by how Firewalker does," said Norris. "The audience tells you what you'll be doing or not doing. Like Stallone - - he'll never do Rhinestone again."

Norris knew he was taking a risk. He said, "When I got crucified in my first film, Good Guys Wear Black, I went to Steve McQueen. He said the bottom line is if you get the best reviews in the world and the movie bombs, you're not going to get work. But if it's a huge success, whether the criticism is good or bad, you'll work. The key thing is -- does the public accept you?"

Filming took place in Mexico in June 1986.

"I learned to speak Spanish and had a splendid time," said Anderson. "Chuck was incredible to work with, such a nice man... J. Lee was a character. Some days the heat got to him worse than 
others. He would get tired and cranky, but we got along great. At the time, I had no idea the director in The Exorcist was based on him. And even though it was a Cannon film, I got all my money!”

Release

Home media
Firewalker was released on DVD by MGM Home Video March 22, 2005.

Reception

Box office
The film was one of Cannon's strongest performing movies at the box office in 1986. However, it was a relative disappointment compared to other Norris films, earning a little over $10 million. It was ultimately considered a flop. Cannon went into financial receivership soon afterwards.

Critical response
Firewalker received overwhelmingly negative reviews.

On At the Movies, Gene Siskel and Roger Ebert gave the picture "two thumbs down". Siskel said Firewalker was "one of the most derivative films in years, splicing elements of Raiders of the Lost Ark with Romancing the Stone." He went on saying he believed "the movie was probably signed as a deal one month after the grosses started coming in for Romancing, and that was where the creativity stopped". Ebert said that he "would have tried to make a picture that didn't look like a cheap, watered-down, pale, and uninteresting version of all those other adventure movies". In his print review, Ebert gave Firewalker 1 star out of 4:

...the movie is a free-form anthology of familiar images from the works of Steven Spielberg, subjected to a new process that we could call discolorization...(the film) lacked the style, witty dialogue and magic of the current adventure movies, as it borrowed its closing images from the Indiana Jones films, but its press notes optimistically claim the picture is "in the tradition" of Romancing the Stone. In literature, it's called plagiarism. In the movies, it's homage.

Vincent Canby of The New York Times called the film "a bargain-basement imitation of such movies as Indiana Jones and the Temple of Doom, Romancing the Stone, et al". Canby also noted Norris's lack of comedic timing as he "stomped on the film's facetious dialogue". TV Guide published a largely negative review, criticizing Norris's "usual wooden" performance, the "appalling" production values and the "flat, uninteresting" writing. The publication also noted Firewalker heavily "borrowing" elements from other, more successful adventure movies, calling it "a retooling of Raiders of the Lost Ark as a buddy picture". A review in Variety said, "Chuck Norris' latest outing for Cannon suffers from boilerplate scripting which sabotages what should have been a compelling buddy pic; not even the estimable Lou Gossett can save this one. Duo moves predictably through a search-for-the-gold yarn that is devoid of suspense."

Film historian Leonard Maltin seemed to agree, citing the picture as a "BOMB" and noting that "If Melody Anderson's hair (which remains perfectly intact throughout) and Sonny Landham's eyepatch (which keeps switching eyes) aren't a sign of anything, the movie's own press release described Chuck Norris's character as 'a soldier of outrageous misfortune'. Moreover, on the comedy-relief front, Norris brings to mind a now-famous description of Yogi Berra playing third base: 'Like a man pitching a pup-tent during a hurricane.' Arguably Chuck at his worst; but who wants to argue?"

In a review written by Rita Kempley of The Washington Post, Norris was described as pleasant galoot that lacked Arnold Schwarzenegger's (a more popular and successful action star) sense of self parody and comic timing. Kempley felt "the fight scenes were fine, but they only emphasize the plodding pace and the moldy plot; a blend of Poltergeist II, Temple of Doom and Romancing the Stone".
 
On Rotten Tomatoes the film has an approval rating of 8% based on reviews from 12 critics. On Metacritic the movie has a weighted average score of 37 out of 100, based on 8 critics, indicating "generally unfavorable reviews".

See also
 List of American films of 1986
 Chuck Norris filmography

References

External links
 
 
 Firewalker at Letterbox DVD
 

1986 films
American action comedy films
1980s action adventure films
1980s action comedy films
1980s adventure comedy films
American adventure comedy films
Films shot in Mexico
Golan-Globus films
Films directed by J. Lee Thompson
Films scored by Gary Chang
Films set in a fictional country
Treasure hunt films
1986 comedy films
Films produced by Menahem Golan
Films produced by Yoram Globus
1980s English-language films
1980s American films